Pisharody (also spelled Pisharodi, Pisharadi, Pisharoty, or Pisharoti; colloquially known as Sharody) is a Hindu Brahmin community from Kerala, India.  As Vaishnavites Pisharodys were traditionally caretakers of Hindu temples and considered as Gurus or Acharyas who taught the Vedic texts. Most Pisharams (Pisharody ancestral households) are situated near Lord Krishna or Goddess Devi temples. Hence, they are known as Ambalavasis. They generally carry Vaishnavite surnames (Ramakrishnan, Narayanan, Gopalan, etc.) and a majority of the community still does teaching as their major profession. Pisharodies are not required to wear the sacred thread, however many pisharody families do conduct upanayanam poojas/ceremonies where the sons of the family are seen wearing the sacred thread.

Origins
The Pisharodys belong to Koushika Gotra and deeply connected to the revered Saint Swami Narayana, based on the folklore that the earliest Pisharody was a patron saint who later took on the title Shri Swamy Narayana, and brought his disciples to merge with the Vaishnavaite school of thought in the post Adi Shankaracharya period in Kerala.

Etymology
Etymologically, the word owes its origins to the saintly antecedents of the community. Bhikhshuvar (Brahmin) + Adikal (reverential addressing / honorific suffix) = Bhikhshuvaradikal, later corrupted to Pisharodikal and pisharody ( Shara itself being a term for a younger sanyasi).
There is also another theory behind the origin of the name Pisharody. According to this, Pisharodys are descendants of a group of highly respected pure Brahmins, believed to be from Kashmir, who intended to become Sannyasis. During the process of initiation to sanyasam, the aspirants are referred as "sharas" in Sanskrit. However, few in the group could not complete the process to become full time "sanyasis". By then they had discarded almost all basic rituals usually performed by an ordinary brahman being elevated to the next level and hence they could not return to their earlier tradition. Since they are already elevated to Sanyasi thought process, they continued as gurus/advisors to temples and authentic teachers of scriptures and higher level sanskrit.  Thereafter this 'Shara' group and their descendants were called as Pisharody, later colloquialized into sharody, Pisharady and Sharoty. Pisharodys do not need to wear the sacred thread nor perform puja in temples as per the tradition, but act only as advisers. They do not cremate the dead body being a sanyasi, instead do the burial as samadhi, as the person has been characterised with  all sanyasi qualities. The last rites are oriented towards "Vishnusayoojyam" and the atma is directly submitted/given to lord vishnu. Therefore, there are no 'Bhrammarakshas' for this community and also do not perform the 'shradham' the usual annual death ritual, unlike other Hindus, reason being their 'atma/jeeva' had already been merged with lord Vishnu after the death. The life of a 'shara' is considered as the last form of human birth and it is believed that, there will not be any rebirth.

Notable people
PS Pisharody
Attoor Krishna Pisharody
Achyuta Pisharati
P.K Bharatha Pisharody
Dr R V Pisharody
Cherukad Govinda Pisharody
K. P. Narayana Pisharody
T.P. Narayana Pisharody
Pisharoth Rama Pisharoty
Kalamandalam Vasu Pisharody
N. N. Pisharody
Ramesh Pisharody

See also
Ambalavasi
List of Ambalavasis

References

2.

https://www.jstor.org/stable/2843601?seq=1

External links
Pisharody Samajam
History
Pisharoti Rituals published by Journal of the Royal Anthropological Institute of Great Britain and Ireland, Vol. 56, 1926 (1926), pp. 83-89
Malayala Manorama article on Aryabhata and the Kallil pisharam

Kerala society
Indian surnames